Little Men (1940) is an American film based on the novel Little Men (1871) by Louisa May Alcott. Norman Z. McLeod directed the film.   It is the second sequel to Little Women (1933 film) after Little Men (1934 film)

Plot 

Jo March (Kay Francis), the lead character in Alcott's novel Little Women,  now runs a private school for young boys.

Cast 
 Kay Francis as Jo March
 Jack Oakie as Willie the Fox
 George Bancroft as Major Burdle
 Jimmy Lydon as Dan
 Ann Gillis as Nan
 Carl Esmond as Professor Bhaer
 Richard Nichols as Teddy
 Francesca Santoro as Bess
 Lillian Randolph as Asia
 Johnny Burke as Silas  
 Sammy McKim as Tommy
 Edward Rice as Demi
 Anne Howard as Daisy
 Jimmy Zahner as Jack
 Bobby Cooper as Adolphus
 Schuyler Standish as Nat
 Paul Matthews as Stuffy
 Tony Neil as Ned
 Fred Estes as Emmett
 Douglas Rucker as Billy
 Donald Rackerby as Frank
 William Demarest as Constable Tom Thorpe
 Sterling Holloway as Reporter
 Isabel Jewell as Stella
 Elsie the Cow as Buttercup

Charles Arnt, Stanley Blystone, Nora Cecil, Hal K. Dawson, Sarah Edwards, George D. Green, Jack Henderson, Howard C. Hickman, Lloyd Ingraham, George Irving, William Irving, Bud Jamison, Nella Walker, Clarence Wilson and Duke York appear uncredited.

Soundtrack 
Lillian Randolph - "Roll, Jordan, Roll" (Traditional Negro spiritual)
Schuyler Standish - "Jeanie With the Light Brown Hair" (Written by Stephen Foster)
Lillian Randolph - "Aura Lea" (Music by George R. Poulton, lyrics by W.W. Fosdick)

Reception
The film recorded a loss of $214,000.

See also
 Little Women (disambiguation)

References

External links 
 
 
 
 

1940 films
1940 comedy-drama films
American comedy-drama films
American black-and-white films
Films scored by Roy Webb
Films directed by Norman Z. McLeod
Films about educators
Films based on American novels
Films based on works by Louisa May Alcott
Works based on Little Women
Films set in schools
RKO Pictures films
Little Men
1940s English-language films
1940s American films